Kovalyuk or Kovaliuk (Russian, Ukrainian: Ковалюк), Kavaluk (Belarusian: Кавалюк), Kowaluk (Polish) is a common East Slavic surname, similar to Kovalchuk in origin and usage.

The surname may refer to:

Siarhiej Kavaluk (born 1980), Belarusian footballer
Volodymyr Kovalyuk (born 1972), Ukrainian footballer
 (1937-2000), Ukrainian writer

References

Russian-language surnames
Belarusian-language surnames
Ukrainian-language surnames
Polish-language surnames
Surnames of Ukrainian origin